Prairies are ecosystems considered part of the temperate grasslands, savannas, and shrublands biome by ecologists, based on similar temperate climates, moderate rainfall, and a composition of grasses, herbs, and shrubs, rather than trees, as the dominant vegetation type. Temperate grassland regions include the Pampas of Argentina, Brazil and Uruguay, and the steppe of Ukraine, Russia and Kazakhstan. Lands typically referred to as "prairie" tend to be in North America. The term encompasses the area referred to as the Interior Lowlands of Canada, the United States, and Mexico, which includes all of the Great Plains as well as the wetter, hillier land to the east.

In the U.S., the area is constituted by most or all of the states of North Dakota, South Dakota, Nebraska, Kansas, and Oklahoma, and sizable parts of the states of Montana, Wyoming, Colorado, New Mexico, Texas, Missouri, Iowa, Illinois, Indiana, Wisconsin, and western and southern Minnesota. The Palouse of Washington and the Central Valley of California are also prairies. The Canadian Prairies occupy vast areas of Manitoba, Saskatchewan, and Alberta. Prairies contain various lush flora and fauna, often contain rich soil maintained by biodiversity, with a temperate climate and a varied view.

Etymology

According to Theodore Roosevelt: Prairie is the French word for "meadow" formed ultimately from the Latin root word pratum (same meaning).

Formation 

The formation of the North American Prairies started with the uplift of the Rocky Mountains near Alberta. The mountains created a rain shadow that resulted in lower precipitation rates downwind.

The parent material of most prairie soil was distributed during the last glacial advance that began about 110,000 years ago. The glaciers expanding southward scraped the landscape, picking up geologic material and leveling the terrain. As the glaciers retreated about 10,000 years ago, they deposited this material in the form of till. Wind based loess deposits also form an important parent material for prairie soils.

Tallgrass prairie evolved over tens of thousands of years with the disturbances of grazing and fire. Native ungulates such as bison, elk, and white-tailed deer roamed the expansive, diverse grasslands before European colonization of the Americas. For 10,000-20,000 years, native people used fire annually as a tool to assist in hunting, transportation, and safety. Evidence of ignition sources of fire in the tall grass prairie are overwhelmingly human as opposed to lightning. Humans, and grazing animals, were active participants in the process of prairie formation and the establishment of the diversity of graminoid and forbs species. Fire has the effect on prairies of removing trees, clearing dead plant matter, and changing the availability of certain nutrients in the soil from the ash produced. Fire kills the vascular tissue of trees, but not prairie species, as up to 75% (depending on the species) of the total plant biomass is below the soil surface and will re-grow from its deep (upwards of 20 feet) roots. Without disturbance, trees will encroach on a grassland and cast shade, which suppresses the understory. Prairie and widely spaced oak trees evolved to coexist in the oak savanna ecosystem.

Fertility 
In spite of long recurrent droughts and occasional torrential rains, the grasslands of the Great Plains were not subject to great soil erosion. The root systems of native prairie grasses firmly held the soil in place to prevent run-off of soil. When the plant died, the fungi and bacteria returned its nutrients to the soil. These deep roots also helped native prairie plants reach water in even the driest conditions. Native grasses suffer much less damage from dry conditions than many farm crops currently grown.

Geographical regions

Prairie in North America is usually split into three groups: wet, mesic, and dry. They are generally characterized by tallgrass prairie, mixed, or shortgrass prairie, depending on the quality of soil and rainfall.

Wet
In wet prairies the soil is usually very moist, including during most of the growing season, because of poor water drainage. The resulting stagnant water is conducive to the formation of bogs and fens. Wet prairies have excellent farming soil. The average precipitation is  a year.

Mesic
Mesic prairie has good drainage, but good soil during the growing season. This type of prairie is the most often converted for agricultural usage; consequently, it is one of the most endangered types of prairie.

Dry

Dry prairie has somewhat wet to very dry soil during the growing season because of good drainage in the soil. Often, this type of prairie can be found on uplands or slopes. Dry soil usually doesn't get much vegetation due to lack of rain. This is the dominant biome in the Southern Canadian agricultural and climatic region known as Palliser's Triangle. Once thought to be completely unarable, the Triangle is now one of the most important agricultural regions in Canada thanks to advances in irrigation technology. In addition to its very high local importance to Canada, Palliser's Triangle is now also one of the most important sources of wheat in the world as a result of these improved methods of watering wheat fields (along with the rest of the Southern prairie provinces which also grow wheat, canola and many other grains). Despite these advances in farming technology, the area is still very prone to extended periods of drought, which can be disastrous for the industry if it is significantly prolonged. An infamous example of this is the Dust Bowl of the 1930s, which also hit much of the United States Great Plains ecoregion, contributing greatly to the Great Depression.

Environmental history

Bison hunting 

Nomadic hunting has been the main human activity on the prairies for the majority of the archaeological record. This once included many now-extinct species of megafauna.

After the other extinctions, the main hunted animal on the prairies was the plains bison. Using loud noises and waving large signals, Native peoples would drive bison into fenced pens called buffalo pounds to be killed with bows and arrows or spears, or drive them off a cliff (called a buffalo jump), to kill or injure the bison en masse. The introduction of the horse and the gun greatly expanded the killing power of the plains Natives. This was followed by the policy of indiscriminate killing by European Americans and Canadians for both commercial reasons and to weaken the independence of plains Natives, and caused a dramatic drop in bison numbers from millions to a few hundred in a century's time, and almost caused their extinction.

Farming and ranching

The very dense soil plagued the first European settlers who were using wooden plows, which were more suitable for loose forest soil. On the prairie, the plows bounced around, and the soil stuck to them. This problem was solved in 1837 by an Illinois blacksmith named John Deere who developed a steel moldboard plow that was stronger and cut the roots, making the fertile soils ready for farming. Former grasslands are now among the most productive agricultural lands on Earth.

The tallgrass prairie has been converted into one of the most intensive crop producing areas in North America. Less than one tenth of one percent (<0.09%) of the original landcover of the tallgrass prairie biome remains. Much of what persists is in cemetery prairies, railroad rights-of-way, or rocky/sandy/hilly places unsuitable for agriculture. States formerly with landcover in native tallgrass prairie such as Iowa, Illinois, Minnesota, Wisconsin, Nebraska, and Missouri have become valued for their highly productive soils and are included in the Corn Belt. As an example of this land use intensity, Illinois and Iowa rank 49th and 50th, out of 50 US states, in total uncultivated land remaining.

Drier shortgrass prairies were once used mostly for open-range ranching. With the development of barbed wire in the 1870s and improved irrigation techniques, this region has mostly been converted to cropland and small fenced pastures.

Biofuels 

Research by David Tilman, ecologist at the University of Minnesota, suggests that "Biofuels made from high-diversity mixtures of prairie plants can reduce global warming by removing carbon dioxide from the atmosphere. Even when grown on infertile soils, they can provide a substantial portion of global energy needs, and leave fertile land for food production." Unlike corn and soybeans, which are both directly and indirectly major food crops, including livestock feed, prairie grasses are not used for human consumption. Prairie grasses can be grown in infertile soil, eliminating the cost of adding nutrients to the soil. Tilman and his colleagues estimate that prairie grass biofuels would yield 51 percent more energy per acre than ethanol from corn grown on fertile land. Some plants commonly used are lupine, big bluestem (turkey foot), blazing star, switchgrass, and prairie clover.

Preservation 
Because rich and thick topsoil made the land well suited for agricultural use, only 1% of tallgrass prairie remains in the U.S. today. Shortgrass prairie is more abundant.

Significant preserved areas of prairie include:
 Alderville Black Oak Savanna; Rice Lake, Ontario
 American Prairie, Phillips and Blaine counties, Montana
 Clymer Meadow Preserve, Hunt County, Texas
 Cypress Hills Interprovincial Park, Alberta and Saskatchewan
 Goose Lake Prairie State Natural Area, Grundy County, Illinois
 Grasslands National Park, Saskatchewan
 Hoosier Prairie, Lake County, Indiana
 James Woodworth Prairie Preserve, a virgin prairie owned by University of Illinois, Glenview, Illinois 
 Jennings Environmental Education Center, Pennsylvania
 Kissimmee Prairie Preserve State Park, Okeechobee County, Florida
 Konza Prairie, Manhattan, Kansas
 Midewin National Tallgrass Prairie, in Will County, Illinois
 Mnoké Prairie, Indiana Dunes National Park, Porter, Indiana
 Nachusa Grasslands, a Nature Conservancy preserve near Franklin Grove, Illinois
 Wichita Mountains Wildlife Refuge, in Comanche County, Oklahoma
 Neal Smith National Wildlife Refuge, Iowa
 Nine-Mile Prairie, Nebraska
 Ojibway prairie in Windsor, Ontario. 
 Paynes Prairie Preserve State Park, Alachua County, Florida
 Richard Bong State Recreation Area, in Kenosha County, Wisconsin
 Russell R. Kirt Prairie, College of DuPage, Illinois 
 Tallgrass Aspen Parkland, Manitoba & Minnesota
 Tallgrass Prairie National Preserve, Kansas
 Tallgrass Prairie Preserve , Oklahoma
 University of Wisconsin–Madison Arboretum, University of Wisconsin–Madison, Wisconsin
 Zumwalt Prairie, Wallowa County, Oregon

Virgin prairies 
Virgin prairie refers to prairie land that has never been plowed. Small virgin prairies exist in the American Midwestern states and in Canada. Restored prairie refers to a prairie that has been reseeded after plowing or other disturbance.

Prairie garden 
A prairie garden is a garden primarily consisting of plants from a prairie.

Physiography

The originally treeless prairies of the upper Mississippi basin began in Indiana, and extended westward and north-westward, until they merged with the drier region known as the Great Plains. An eastward extension of the same region, originally tree-covered, extended to central Ohio. Thus, the prairies generally lie between the Ohio and Missouri rivers on the south and the Great Lakes on the north. The prairies are a contribution of the glacial period. They consist for the most part of glacial drift, deposited unconformably on an underlying rock surface of moderate or small relief. Here, the rocks are an extension of the same stratified Palaeozoic formations already described as occurring in the Appalachian region and around the Great Lakes. They are usually fine-textured limestones and shales, lying horizontal. The moderate or small relief that they were given by mature preglacial erosion is now buried under the drift.

The greatest area of the prairies, from Indiana to North Dakota, consists of till plains, that is, sheets of unstratified drift. These plains are 30, 50 or even 100 ft (up to 30 m) thick covering the underlying rock surface for thousands of square miles except where postglacial stream erosion has locally laid it bare. The plains have an extraordinarily even surface. The till is presumably made in part of preglacial soils, but it is more largely composed of rock waste mechanically transported by the creeping ice sheets. Although the crystalline rocks from Canada and some of the more resistant stratified rocks south of the Great Lakes occur as boulders and stones, a great part of the till has been crushed and ground to a clayey texture. The till plains, although sweeping in broad swells of slowly changing altitude, often appear level to the eye with a view stretching to the horizon. Here and there, faint depressions occur, occupied by marshy sloughs, or floored with a rich black soil of postglacial origin. It is thus by sub-glacial aggradation that the prairies have been levelled up to a smooth surface, in contrast to the higher and non-glaciated hilly country just to the south.

The great ice sheets formed terminal moraines around their border at various end stages. However, the morainic belts are of small relief in comparison to the great area of the ice. They rise gently from the till plains to a height of 50, 100 or more feet. They may be one, two or three miles (5 km) wide and their hilly surface, dotted over with boulders, contains many small lakes in basins or hollows, instead of streams in valleys. The morainic belts are arranged in groups of concentric loops, convex southward, because the ice sheets advanced in lobes along the lowlands of the Great Lakes. Neighboring morainic loops join each other in re-entrants (north-pointing cusps), where two adjacent glacial lobes came together and formed their moraines in largest volume. The moraines are of too small relief to be shown on any maps except of the largest scale. Small as they are, they are the chief relief of the prairie states, and, in association with the nearly imperceptible slopes of the till plains, they determine the course of many streams and rivers, which as a whole are consequent upon the surface form of the glacial deposits.

The complexity of the glacial period and its subdivision into several glacial epochs, separated by interglacial epochs of considerable length (certainly longer than the postglacial epoch) has a structural consequence in the superposition of successive till sheets, alternating with non-glacial deposits. It also has a physiographic consequence in the very different amount of normal postglacial erosion suffered by the different parts of the glacial deposits. The southernmost drift sheets, as in southern Iowa and northern Missouri, have lost their initially plain surface and are now maturely dissected into gracefully rolling forms. Here, the valleys of even the small streams are well opened and graded, and marshes and lakes are rare. These sheets are of early Pleistocene origin. Nearer the Great Lakes, the till sheets are trenched only by the narrow valleys of the large streams. Marshy sloughs still occupy the faint depressions in the till plains and the associated moraines have abundant small lakes in their undrained hollows. These drift sheets are of late Pleistocene origin.

When the ice sheets extended to the land sloping southward to the Ohio River, Mississippi River and Missouri River, the drift-laden streams flowed freely away from the ice border. As the streams escaped from their subglacial channels, they spread into broader channels and deposited some of their load, and thus aggraded their courses. Local sheets or aprons of gravel and sand are spread more or less abundantly along the outer side of the morainic belts. Long trains of gravel and sands clog the valleys that lead southward from the glaciated to the non-glaciated area. Later, when the ice retreated farther and the unloaded streams returned to their earlier degrading habit, they more or less completely scoured out the valley deposits, the remains of which are now seen in terraces on either side of the present flood plains.

When the ice of the last glacial epoch had retreated so far that its front border lay on a northward slope, belonging to the drainage area of the Great Lakes, bodies of water accumulated in front of the ice margin, forming glacio-marginal lakes. The lakes were small at first, and each had its own outlet at the lowest depression of land to the south. As the ice melted further back, neighboring lakes became confluent at the level of the lowest outlet of the group. The outflowing streams grew in the same proportion and eroded a broad channel across the height of land and far down stream, while the lake waters built sand reefs or carved shore cliffs along their margin, and laid down sheets of clay on their floors. All of these features are easily recognized in the prairie region. The present site of Chicago was determined by an Indian portage or carry across the low divide between Lake Michigan and the headwaters of the Illinois River. This divide lies on the floor of the former outlet channel of the glacial Lake Michigan. Corresponding outlets are known for Lake Erie, Lake Huron, and Lake Superior. A very large sheet of water, named Lake Agassiz, once overspread a broad till plain in northern Minnesota and North Dakota. The outlet of this glacial lake, called river Warren, eroded a large channel in which the Minnesota River evident today. The Red River of the North flows northward through a plain formerly covered by Lake Agassiz.

Certain extraordinary features were produced when the retreat of the ice sheet had progressed so far as to open an eastward outlet for the marginal lakes. This outlet occurred along the depression between the northward slope of the Appalachian plateau in west-central New York and the southward slope of the melting ice sheet. When this eastward outlet came to be lower than the south-westward outlet across the height of land to the Ohio or Mississippi river, the discharge of the marginal lakes was changed from the Mississippi system to the Hudson system. Many well-defined channels, cutting across the north-sloping spurs of the plateau in the neighborhood of Syracuse, New York, mark the temporary paths of the ice-bordered outlet river. Successive channels are found at lower and lower levels on the plateau slope, indicating the successive courses taken by the lake outlet as the ice melted farther and farther back. On some of these channels, deep gorges were eroded heading in temporary cataracts which exceeded Niagara in height but not in breadth. The pools excavated by the plunging waters at the head of the gorges are now occupied by little lakes. The most significant stage in this series of changes occurred when the glacio-marginal lake waters were lowered so that the long escarpment of Niagara limestone was laid bare in western New York. The previously confluent waters were then divided into two lakes. The higher one, Lake Erie, supplied the outflowing Niagara River, which poured its waters down the escarpment to the lower, Lake Ontario. This gave rise to Niagara Falls. Lake Ontario's outlet for a time ran down the Mohawk Valley to the Hudson River. At this higher elevation, it was known as Lake Iroquois. When the ice melted from the northeastern end of the lake, it dropped to a lower level, and drained through the St. Lawrence area. This created a lower base level for the Niagara River, increasing its erosive capacity.

These hills are known by the Irish name, drumlins, used for similar hills in north-western Ireland. The most remarkable groups of drumlins occur in western New York, where their number is estimated at over 6,000, and in southern Wisconsin, where it is placed at 5,000. They completely dominate the topography of their districts.

A curious deposit of an impalpably fine and unstratified silt, known by the German name bess (or loess), lies on the older drift sheets near the larger river courses of the upper Mississippi basin. It contains land shells, and hence cannot be attributed to marine or lacustrine submergence. The best explanation is that, during certain phases of the glacial period, it was carried as dust by the winds from the flood plains of aggrading rivers, and slowly deposited on the neighboring grass-covered plains. The glacial and eolian origin of this sediment is evidenced by the angularity of its grains (a bank of it will stand without slumping for years), whereas, if it had been transported significantly by water, the grains would have been rounded and polished. Loess is parent material for an extremely fertile, but droughty soil.

Southwestern Wisconsin and parts of the adjacent states of Illinois, Iowa, and Minnesota are known as the driftless zone, because, although bordered by drift sheets and moraines, it is free from glacial deposits. It must therefore have been a sort of oasis, when the ice sheets from the north advanced past it on the east and west, and joined around its southern border. The reason for this exemption from glaciation is the converse of that for the southward convexity of the morainic loops. For while they mark the paths of greatest glacial advance along lowland troughs (lake basins), the driftless zone is a district protected from ice invasion by reason of the obstruction which the highlands of northern Wisconsin and Michigan (part of the Superior upland) offered to glacial advance.

The course of the upper Mississippi River is largely consequent upon glacial deposits. Its sources are in the morainic lakes in northern Minnesota. The drift deposits thereabouts are so heavy that the present divides between the drainage basins of Hudson Bay, Lake Superior, and the Gulf of Mexico evidently stand in no very definite relation to the preglacial divides. The course of the Mississippi through Minnesota is largely guided by the form of the drift cover. Several rapids and the Saint Anthony Falls (determining the site of Minneapolis) are signs of immaturity, resulting from superposition through the drift on the under rock. This valley seems to represent the path of an enlarged early-glacial Mississippi, when much precipitation that is today discharged to Hudson Bay and the Gulf of St Lawrence was delivered to the Gulf of Mexico, for the curves of the present river are of distinctly smaller radii than the curves of the valley. Lake Pepin ( below St. Paul), a picturesque expansion of the river across its flood-plain, is due to the aggradation of the valley floor where the Chippewa River, coming from the northeast, brought an overload of fluvio-glacial drift. Hence, even the father of waters, like so many other rivers in the Northern states, owes many of its features more or less directly to glacial action.

The fertility of the prairies is a natural consequence of their origin. During the mechanical transportation of the till, no vegetation was present to remove the minerals essential to plant growth, as is the case in the soils of normally weathered and dissected peneplains. The soil is similar to the Appalachian piedmont which though not exhausted by the primeval forest cover, are by no means so rich as the till sheets of the prairies. Moreover, whatever the rocky understructure, the till soil has been averaged by a thorough mechanical mixture of rock grindings. Hence, the prairies are continuously fertile for scores of miles together. The true prairies were once covered with a rich growth of natural grass and annual flowering plants, but today, they are covered with farms.

See also 

 Great Plains
 Shortgrass prairie
 Mixed grass prairie
 Tallgrass prairie
 Prairies Ecozone
 Interior Plains
 Canadian Prairies
 Geography of North America
 North American Prairies Province
 Aspen parkland
 Buffalo Commons
 Coastal plain
 Coastal prairie
 Dust Bowl
 Field
 Flooded grasslands and savannas
 Flood-meadow
 Grassland
 Heath
 Meadow
 Outback
 Pampas
 Pasture
 Plain
 Prairie dog
 Prairie madness
 Prairie restoration
 Puszta
 Rangeland
 Savanna
 Steppe
 Switchgrass
 Temperate grasslands, savannas, and shrublands
 Veld
 Water-meadow
 Wet meadow

References

External links 

 The Prairie Enthusiasts – grassland protection and restoration in the upper Midwest
 Prairie Plains Resource Institute
 The Native Prairies Association of Texas
 Importance of fire within the prairie
 Missouri Prairie Foundation
 America’s Grasslands Documentary produced by Prairie Public Television